"A Groovy Kind of Love" is a song written by Toni Wine and Carole Bayer Sager based on a melody by the classical composer Muzio Clementi.

The original rendition was recorded by American singing duo Diane & Annita and released as "Groovey Kind of Love" on the French EP One by One, in 1965. It has since been recorded by numerous artists, with the Mindbenders and Phil Collins releasing successful versions.

Background
"A Groovy Kind of Love" consists of lyrics written by Bayer Sager and Wine, with music by Muzio Clementi. Composition of the song took place at Bayer Sager's home in New York City, only a few blocks away from the Brill Building and 1650 Broadway. Those buildings housed numerous music publishing companies and record labels, including Wine and Bayer Sager's label, Allegro Music (later Screen Gems); the buildings also contained facilities for songwriting and composition. However, Bayer Sager's residence was preferred because it was more comfortable, and more private. Wine composed the music, and Bayer Sager wrote the lyrics.

The title was an early use of the slang word "groovy", and both women were interested in using the word because they recognized it as new and "happening". Wine said, "Carole came up with 'Groovy kinda… groovy kinda… groovy…' and we're all just saying, 'Kinda groovy, kinda groovy, kinda…' and I don't exactly know who came up with "Love", but it was 'Groovy kind of love'. And we did it. We wrote it in 20 minutes. It was amazing. Just flew out of our mouths, and at the piano, it was a real quick and easy song to write."

The melody is from the Rondo from Muzio Clementi's Sonatina, Opus 36, No. 5. Even though Wine and Sager claim full songwriting credits, they mainly wrote the lyrics and just slightly modified Clementi's music. Bayer Sager originally pitched the song to pop star Lesley Gore in early 1965, but Gore's producer at the time, Shelby Singleton, rejected it, as he found the word "groovy" too slangy.

The Mindbenders version

Wayne Fontana and the Mindbenders had enjoyed a cross-atlantic hit with the song "The Game of Love", which topped the Billboard Hot 100 and reached number two in the UK's Record Retailer. However, towards autumn of 1965 Fontana suddenly left the band to embark on a solo career. The trio continued performing however, with guitarist Eric Stewart, later of 10cc, taking the role of a lead vocalist. In search of new material, Shelby Singleton handed the song to the group after rejecting to record it with Lesley Gore. However, in an interview with Keith Altham from New Musical Express, Mindbenders bassist Bob Lang claimed he found a demo of "A Groovy Kind Of Love" on their manager Danny Betesh's desk. Alternatively, other sources claim Jack McGraw, who ran the Screen Gems offices in London, discovered the song and thought it was a perfect match for Stewart's voice.

Nonetheless, it was recorded together with a lead vocal by Eric Stewart with vocal backing consisting of Lang, drummer Ric Rothwell and a female singer in 1965 with Jack Baverstock producing. The single was released in the United Kingdom by Fontana Records on December 10, 1965, as the trio's first single without Wayne Fontana. According to Lang, the single initially failed to take off due to the Christmas rush, but eventually charted. It entered the Record Retailer chart on January 19, 1966, at number 34 before peaking at number two on March 16. It was kept from the number one spot by "These Boots Are Made for Walkin'" by Nancy Sinatra. It exited the chart on April 20 at a position of 37 after spending 14 weeks on the chart. In the US, the single entered the Billboard Hot 100 on April 10 at a position of 78, before reaching its peak of number two on May 28, 1966, a position it would hold for two weeks. "When a Man Loves a Woman" by Percy Sledge kept the song from reaching the top spot. It exited on July 9 at a position of 44 after spending 13 weeks on the chart.

Upon the single reaching the top-ten in the US, Toni Wine phoned her mother, stating that she "was quitting her job" due to the success. Coincidentally, it reached number one on the Cashbox Top 100  and in Record Worldon the day of her nineteenth birthday, June 4. Pre-orders for the single were estimated to be 250 thousand copies in the UK alone and it would go on to sell over a million copies there in total. It was the trio's only top-fifty single in the US which has led them to getting the label of being a one-hit wonder there. "A Groovy Kind of Love" is also credited with bringing the word "groovy" back into the mainstream vocabulary of the 1960s; according to Randy McNutt, in the modern day, "many excellent songs are dated just by one reference to the word 'groovy'", a fate he also several other songs, including "Groovin'" by The Young Rascals.

It was favorably reviewed in the press upon release. Writing for New Musical Express, Derek Johnson states that it was a "commendable first disc", stating it to be an "attractively harmonized rockaballad". However, he also states that the record "needs a few more spins" in order to register and claims that he was uncertain if it would become a hit. In Cashbox magazine, the staff writer describes the single as a "soft, slow telling of a souching love tale", noting it to be a "sweet sweeping ork". Following the singles' success, it would be issued on the Mindbenders eponymous debut album in the UK, while it was the title track of said album in the US.

Charts

Weekly charts

Year-end charts

Phil Collins version 

English drummer, singer-songwriter, record producer, and actor Phil Collins recorded a new version of "A Groovy Kind of Love" in 1988. He had originally suggested the song as a good one for collaborator Stephen Bishop to record, with Collins producing. While filming the movie Buster (1988), Collins suggested the song as a potential love theme for the title character and his wife. He recorded a demo as a guide for the producers, only to find out later his demo had actually been used in the film. Collins had initially expressed reservations about being featured on the soundtrack during the movie, but relented due to feeling it worked well for the scene. He subsequently recorded a full version of the song, co-produced by Anne Dudley. This version was originally released on Buster: The Original Motion Picture Soundtrack. It subsequently appeared on the compilation albums Hits, Love Songs: A Compilation... Old and New, and The Singles. A live performance appeared on his Serious Hits... Live! album.

Unlike the Mindbenders' version, which was an upbeat guitar-based pop song, Collins'  was a slow ballad with a prominent keyboard and strings. When released as a single, it reached No. 1 on both the U.S. and UK charts, becoming Collins' only single to top the charts in both countries; it was his last No. 1 single in the UK.  The single was certified silver in the UK by the British Phonographic Industry. It also reached No. 1 on the US Adult Contemporary chart. It had the longest chart stay of any of Collins' singles on the US Hot 100 at twenty-five weeks. The song earned Collins a Grammy Award nomination for Best Pop Vocal Performance, Male in 1989.

The TV series New Girl featured the Phil Collins version in the episodes "Wedding" (2011) and "The Curse of the Pirate Bride" (2018).

Critical reception
Pan-European magazine Music & Media described Collins' version as "a slushy version of the original '66 hit of the Mindbenders."

Personnel
 Phil Collins: vocals, keyboard, drums
 Orchestra conducted by Anne Dudley

Charts

Weekly charts

Year-end charts

Certifications

Covers
In 1966, Petula Clark released a cover version that was a Top 10 hit in South Africa and Rhodesia.
In 1977, Les Gray released a cover which reached No. 32 in the UK.

References

1960s ballads
1965 debut singles
1977 singles
1988 singles
Labelle songs
The Mindbenders songs
Phil Collins songs
Pop ballads
Billboard Hot 100 number-one singles
Cashbox number-one singles
Number-one singles in Belgium
RPM Top Singles number-one singles
Number-one singles in Denmark
European Hot 100 Singles number-one singles
Irish Singles Chart number-one singles
Dutch Top 40 number-one singles
Number-one singles in Portugal
Number-one singles in South Africa
Number-one singles in Switzerland
UK Singles Chart number-one singles
Songs written by Carole Bayer Sager
1965 songs
Songs written by Toni Wine
Fontana Records singles
Atlantic Records singles
Virgin Records singles
Warner Music Group singles
Popular songs based on classical music